Jun Rundstedt Cabanayan Ebdane (born December 30, 1972) is a Filipino politician who serves as the 23rd Mayor of Iba, Zambales. A member of Sulong Zambales Party, Rundy Ebdane was elected in 2013.

Education
Jun Rundstedt Cabanayan Ebdane is an alumnus of Mapúa Institute of Technology. He also holds a master's degree in Public Administration and completed the Leadership Decision Training at the Kennedy School of Government at Harvard University.

Profession and political career
Prior to his election as Municipal Mayor, he was the Provincial Administrator of the Province of Zambales and was a Police Chief Inspector.

References

1972 births
Living people
Mayors of places in Zambales
Filipino Roman Catholics
Mapúa University alumni
Harvard Kennedy School alumni
People from Zambales